Han Chang-seob (born 13 November 1967) is a South Korean public official. In 2022, he was made Vice Minister of the Ministry of Public Administration and Security. In February 2023, he was made acting Minister of the Interior and Safety after Lee Sang-min was suspended by the National Assembly for his handling of the Seoul Halloween crowd crush.

References 

1967 births
Living people
People from Sangju
21st-century South Korean politicians
Government ministers of South Korea
Interior ministers of South Korea